Cheung Kwai Estate is a public housing estate in Cheung Chau, New Territories, Hong Kong. It is the first public housing estate in Cheung Chau, consisting of 18 residential blocks and accommodating 1,800 people.

Houses

Politics
Cheung Kwai Estate is located in Cheung Chau constituency of the Islands District Council. It was formerly represented by Leung Kwok-ho, who was elected in the 2019 elections until July 2021.

See also

Public housing estates on outlying islands of Hong Kong

References

Public housing estates in Hong Kong
Cheung Chau
Housing estates with centralized LPG system in Hong Kong